In statistical quality control, the np-chart is a type of control chart used to monitor the number of nonconforming units in a sample.  It is an adaptation of the p-chart and used in situations where personnel find it easier to interpret process performance in terms of concrete numbers of units rather than the somewhat more abstract proportion.

The np-chart differs from the p-chart in only the three following aspects:
The number nonconforming (np), rather than the fraction nonconforming (p), is plotted against the control limits.
The sample size, is constant.

See also
p-chart

References

Quality control tools
Statistical charts and diagrams